Rabbi Binyomin Beinush Finkel (1911 – February 13, 1990) was the rosh yeshiva of Yeshivas Mir in Jerusalem.

Biography 

He was born in Mir, Belarus, where his father Rabbi Eliezer Yehuda Finkel was the rosh yeshiva of the Mir yeshiva. Rabbi Finkel acquired most of his Torah knowledge during his studies at the yeshiva. In 1931, he studied under the Chofetz Chaim, and in 1933-34 under Rav Yitzchok Zev Soloveitchik, the Brisker Rov.

After his arrival in Palestine, he became close to the Chazon Ish. He married the daughter of Rav Shmuel Greineman, the Chazon Ish's brother-in-law. After his marriage, he began teaching in Yeshivas Beis Baruch, before becoming a rebbi in Yeshivas Mir, and in 1965, after his father's passing, he began to head the yeshiva.

His son-in-law Rabbi Nosson Tzvi Finkel, (who is also his first cousin's son), is the previous rosh yeshiva of Yeshivas Mir in Jerusalem. Three other sons in-law act as associate Roshei Yeshiva, they are Rabbis Binyomin Carlebach, Nachman Levovitz, and Yisroel Glustein (who also has his own shiur in the Mir) .
Another of his sons-in law, Rabbi Ahron Lopiansky, is rosh yeshiva of Yeshiva of Greater Washington, in Silver Spring, Maryland.

Rabbi Finkel died on February 13, 1990.

References

Rosh yeshivas
1911 births
1990 deaths
Burials at Har HaMenuchot
Mir rosh yeshivas